An air intelligence officer serves to collect information about air operations and assist in the direction of their execution for maximum effect. The evaluation of target damage is an essential task of the air intelligence officer, who is expected to use a variety of technologies to acquire, analyze, and assess information regarding the effects of air operations and the potential results of future operations. The air intelligence office typically serves as the G-2 officer (the staff officer responsible for intelligence) in a particular command staff, however such an officer may also serve as G-3 officer (operations and plans) where their role will be more focused on the direction of air operations than on the collection and analysis of intelligence.

From a 1978 report on the training of US Army air intelligence officers:

References

Air intelligence
Staff (military)